Let Sleeping Corpses Lie is a career-spanning five-disc box set of the band White Zombie. It is named after the 1974 Italian horror film of the same name.

Contents
The set contains a remaster of every album and E.P. released officially by White Zombie from 1985 to 1996, including six non-album songs, on four discs. However, not every song the band recorded can be found here: notably absent are "Black Friday" and "Dead or Alive", the two songs added to the 1989 cassette re-release of Gods on Voodoo Moon. The fifth disc is a DVD containing all nine of the band's music videos along with ten live performances.

Track listing

Hidden gems
This DVD contains a few easter eggs.
The full-length film White Zombie starring Béla Lugosi. To access the movie, select title 5 on your DVD remote or DVD menu.
Alternative version of the "Thunder Kiss '65" music video that can be accessed by selecting angle 2 with DVD remote.

References

White Zombie (band) albums
2008 compilation albums
2008 video albums
Music video compilation albums
2008 live albums
Live video albums
Geffen Records compilation albums
Geffen Records live albums
Geffen Records video albums